Eastport is an unincorporated community in Boundary County, Idaho, United States. It is connected to Canada by the Eastport-Kingsgate Border Crossing. Eastport has a post office with ZIP code 83826.

History
Eastport's population was 50 in 1909, and was estimated at 100 in 1960.

References

Unincorporated communities in Boundary County, Idaho
Unincorporated communities in Idaho